Daniel Chaves da Silva (born 10 July 1988) is a Brazilian long-distance runner.

In 2013, he took part in the Bydgoszcz IAAF World Cross Country Championships at Myslecinek Park, Bydgoszcz.

He was selected to represent Brazil at the delayed 2020 Tokyo Olympic Games after he achieved the Olympic qualifying time on April 28, 2019 finishing 15th in the London Marathon with 2:11:10.

Personal bests
Outdoor
3000 metres – 8:07.35 (Wageningen 2012)
5000 metres – 13:46.56 (Oordegem 2010)
10000 metres – 28:19.3h (Rio de Janeiro 2015)
Road
10K – 28:46 (Cipolletti 2017)
Half marathon – 1:03:19 (Rio de Janeiro 2013) 
Marathon – 2:11:10 (London 2019)

References

External links

Brazilian male long-distance runners
Living people
Athletes (track and field) at the 2015 Pan American Games
Pan American Games competitors for Brazil
Athletes (track and field) at the 2020 Summer Olympics
Olympic athletes of Brazil
1988 births
People from Petrópolis
Sportspeople from Rio de Janeiro (state)
20th-century Brazilian people
21st-century Brazilian people